Thornton-le-Moors is a village and civil parish in the unitary authority of Cheshire West and Chester and the ceremonial county of Cheshire, England. At the census of 2001 it had a population of 260, reducing slightly to 253 at the 2011 census.

The village is seven miles north east of the city of Chester. It is situated to the south of the A5117 road.  To the north of the village is the Stanlow Refinery. To the west is the nearest town of Ellesmere Port and to the north east is the nearest village, Elton.

History
Thornton le Moors was a township in Thornton Parish, Eddisbury Hundred, which became a civil parish in 1866. The population was 156 in 1801, 186 in 1851, 130 in 1901, 223 in 1951 and 260 in 2001.

Religious sites
St Mary's Church, Thornton-le-Moors is a Grade I listed building. The church has recently undergone restoration.

Transport
Ince & Elton has a minimal service.

Thornton-le-Moors is served by a regular hourly bus between Chester and Runcorn, operated by Stagecoach Merseyside and South Lancashire.

See also

Listed buildings in Thornton-le-Moors

References

External links

Villages in Cheshire
Civil parishes in Cheshire